Thao River is the upper stretch of the Red River, originates from Weishan Yi and Hui Autonomous County, Yunnan Province, China, flows through three Vietnamese provinces, including Lao Cai Province, Yen Bai Province and Phu Tho Province. Thao River merges with Black River and Lo River at Viet Tri City, Phu Tho Province, Vietnam.

The river in China is called Yuan River.

The river is known for Song Thao Campaign by Viet Minh in 1949, during the First Indochina War. The campaign started on 19 May and ended on 18 July, with the victory of Viet Minh over the French.

References

Rivers of Phú Thọ province
Rivers of Yunnan
Geography of Dali Bai Autonomous Prefecture
Geography of Pu'er
Rivers of Vietnam